Frank Fairbairn Laming (24 August 1908 – 3 June 1989) was an Anglican priest in the 20th century.

He was born on 24 August 1908 and educated at Durham University and Edinburgh Theological College and ordained in 1937. His first post was as Assistant Priest at Christ Church, Glasgow. He was then Priest in Charge of St Margaret, Renfrew and after that Rector of  Holy Trinity Church, Motherwell. He died on 3 June 1989.

Notes

1908 births
Alumni of Durham University
Provosts of St Mary's Cathedral, Glasgow
Provosts of Inverness Cathedral
1989 deaths
Alumni of Edinburgh Theological College